Highway 795 is a provincial highway in the Canadian province of Saskatchewan. It runs from Highway 26 to Turtle Lake South Bay, where it transitions into the Turtle Lake Access Road. Highway 795 is about 47 km (29 mi.) long and intersects Highway 796.

Highway 795 passes through or near the communities of Stowlea, Bright Sand, Powm Beach, Aspen Cove, Livelong, and Turtle Lake South Bay. Highway 795 also provides access to Brightsand Lake Regional Park.

See also 
Roads in Saskatchewan
Transportation in Saskatchewan

References 

795